Vaughn Harlen Hebron (born October 7, 1970) is a former American football running back who played in the National Football League (NFL) for the Philadelphia Eagles and Denver Broncos.

Early life
Hebron attended and played high school football at the Cardinal Gibbons School. He also participated in track and field. Hebron graduated high school in 1989.

Hebron played college football at Virginia Tech.

Professional career
Hebron signed as a free-agent with the Philadelphia Eagles where he played running back. After two seasons with the Eagles, he signed with the Denver Broncos, where he was a member of two Super Bowl winning teams (Super Bowl XXXII and Super Bowl XXXIII). Hebron holds multiple Broncos franchise records for kickoff returns, including the highest amount of career kickoff returns (134) and highest amount of career kickoff return yards (3,324).

Coaching career
Hebron was named the head coach of the Trenton Lightning of the Indoor Professional Football League in 2001.

After football
Hebron is currently CEO and President of VMS Movement Specialists, a fitness center and personal training studio located in Newtown, Pennsylvania. He was an analyst for Eagles Post Game Live on Comcast SportsNet Philadelphia, which airs after every Philadelphia Eagles game. He starred alongside host Michael Barkann, Pennsylvania Governor Ed Rendell, and Ray Didinger. Hebron was replaced by retired Eagles offensive tackle Tra Thomas for the 2011–2012 NFL season.

He was interviewed for an episode of NFL's Greatest Games which aired on ESPN2.

References

External links
 

1970 births
Living people
Players of American football from Baltimore
American football running backs
Denver Broncos players
Philadelphia Eagles players
Virginia Tech Hokies football players